Nick Sörensen (born October 23, 1994) is a Danish-born Swedish former professional ice hockey right wing who played in the Swedish Hockey League (SHL) and with the Anaheim Ducks in the National Hockey League (NHL). He was drafted by the Ducks in the 2013 NHL Entry Draft, 45th overall.

Playing career
Sörensen played as a youth and made his professional debut with Rögle BK in the HockeyAllsvenskan. In order to pursue a NHL career, he moved to North America and played as an import in the Quebec Major Junior Hockey League with the Quebec Remparts before getting drafted 45th overall in the 2013 NHL Entry Draft by the Anaheim Ducks. On April 3, 2014, Sörensen signed to a three-year entry-level contract with the Anaheim Ducks.

Sörensen made his Swedish Hockey League debut during the 2014–15 season with Skellefteå AIK before transferring to fellow participant Linköpings HC for the 2015–16 season on loan from the Ducks.

In the 2016–17 season, having returned to North America, Sörensen made the opening night roster out of training camp. He made his debut with the Ducks against the Dallas Stars on October 13, 2016. He recorded his first NHL point, an assist against the Philadelphia Flyers on October 20, 2016. Two days later and having appeared in 5 games with Anaheim, Sörensen was re-assigned to American Hockey League affiliate, the San Diego Gulls. He played the remainder of the season in San Diego, collecting 22 points in 48 games.

In the off-season, Sörensen opted to leave the Ducks and return to previous club, Linköpings HC of the SHL, in signing a two-year contract on May 23, 2017. Returning for a third season with Linköpings HC, Sörensen was scoreless in 6 games to begin the 2019 – 20 season, before leaving the club and opting to return to original club, Rögle BK, for the remainder of the SHL season on 29 September 2019. He registered 5 points through 15 games with Rögle BK, before suffering a season ending concussion on 28 November 2019.

Having suffered his seventh recorded concussion through his career, leading to injuries to his eyes, and on-set depression, Sörensen announced his retirement from professional hockey after 9 seasons.

International play
He has represented Sweden in 2013 and 2014, getting two World Junior Championship silver medals.

Career statistics

Regular season and playoffs

International

References

External links

1994 births
Living people
Anaheim Ducks draft picks
Anaheim Ducks players
People from Holbæk Municipality
Linköping HC players
Quebec Remparts players
Rögle BK players
San Diego Gulls (AHL) players
Skellefteå AIK players
Swedish ice hockey right wingers
Swedish people of Danish descent